Khlong Toei MRT station (code BL24) is a Bangkok MRT station on the Blue Line. Located under Rama IV Road, near Metropolitan Electricity Authority Headquarters and Chaloem Maha Nakhon Expressway in Khlong Toei District, Bangkok.

Construction of the MRT began at this station nine months after the foundation stone was laid by King Maha Vajiralongkorn (while he was the crown prince) on November 19, 1996 at Hua Lamphong station.

Before opened, station is named Bon Kai due to it located near Bon Kai neighborhood, but changed name to Khlong Toei on October 9, 2002.  Although its name is Khlong Toei, Khlong Toei Market is nearer to Queen Sirikit National Convention Center station.

Station details 
Uses a Thai house as its symbol, representing Plai Noen House Museum and color orange. Its underground station, widths 28 metres, lengths 202 metres, depths 18 metres and uses side platforms

There are MetroMall in the station, but not opened.

References 

MRT (Bangkok) stations
Railway stations opened in 2004
2004 establishments in Thailand